Acacia leeuweniana, also commonly known as Leeuwen's wattle or Spear Hill wattle, is a tree belonging to the genus Acacia and the subgenus Juliflorae that is endemic to north western Australia.

Description
It has minii richi bark and inflorescence in spikes. It usually has a single trunk or sometimes few trunks at the base of the tree. The brownish to red coloured bark exfoliates in narrow curled shavings that age to a  grey colour. The terete, brittle branchlets have obscure ribbing. It is known to flower between April and May and as late as October and is thought to bloom in response rainfall events. The simple inflorescences occur in groups of two to six on the axils. The pods are shallowly curved, glabrous and resinous with a visible marginal nerve. The shiny brown seeds are arranged longitudinally and have an 
obloid to ellipsoidal shape.

Taxonomy
The specific epithet honours Stephen van Leeuwen, who was a Scientist who made a large contribution to the understanding of the flora in the Pilbara. The tree is closely related to Acacia cyperophylla.

Distribution
It is native to a small area in the Pilbara region of Western Australia where it is found amongst boulders in rocky outcrops growing in fissures in skeletal sandy loam to gravelly sand soils over and around granite.

See also
 List of Acacia species

References

leeuweniana
Acacias of Western Australia
Plants described in 2008
Taxa named by Bruce Maslin